The list of ships built at Hietalahti shipyard in Helsinki, Finland, is divided into three parts:

 List of ships built at Hietalahti shipyard (1–200)
 List of ships built at Hietalahti shipyard (201–400)
 List of ships built at Hietalahti shipyard (401 onwards)

Hietalahti